Sela Ann Ward (born July 11, 1956) is an American actress, author, and producer. Her breakthrough TV role was as Teddy Reed in the NBC drama series Sisters (1991–1996), for which she received her first Primetime Emmy Award for Outstanding Lead Actress in a Drama Series in 1994. She received her second Primetime Emmy Award and Golden Globe Award for Best Actress – Television Series Drama for the leading role of Lily Manning in the ABC drama series Once and Again (1999–2002). Ward later had the recurring role of Stacy Warner in the Fox medical drama House, also starred as Jo Danville in the CBS police procedural CSI: NY (2010–2013) and starred as Dana Mosier in the CBS police procedural series FBI (2018–2019).

She also played supporting roles in films, including The Man Who Loved Women (1983), Rustlers' Rhapsody (1985), Nothing in Common (1986), Hello Again (1987), The Fugitive (1993), My Fellow Americans (1996), The Badge (2002), The Day After Tomorrow (2004), The Guardian (2006), The Stepfather (2009), Gone Girl (2014), and Independence Day: Resurgence (2016).

Early life

Ward was born in Meridian, Mississippi, to Annie Kate (née Boswell), a housewife, and Granberry Holland "G.H." Ward, Jr., an electrical engineer. Her father is a native of Meridian while her mother was born in Choctaw County, Alabama, before moving to Meridian as a child. Ward is the eldest of four children with a sister, Jenna, and two brothers, Joseph Brock and Granberry Holland Ward III. She graduated from Lamar School in Meridian.

Ward attended the University of Alabama, where she was Homecoming Queen, a Crimson Tide cheerleader, and joined Chi Omega sorority. She double-majored in fine art and advertising. She graduated in 1977.

Career

While working in New York City as a storyboard artist for multimedia presentations, Ward began modeling to supplement her income. She was recruited by the Wilhelmina agency and was soon featured in television commercials promoting Maybelline cosmetics.

Ward eventually moved to California to pursue acting and landed her first film role in the 1983 Burt Reynolds vehicle The Man Who Loved Women. Her first regular role in a television drama series, as a socialite on Dennis Weaver's short-lived CBS series, Emerald Point N.A.S., followed in the same year. Ward continued to land guest roles in both television and films throughout the 1980s, most notably opposite Tom Hanks in 1986's Nothing in Common. In 1991 she was cast as the bohemian alcoholic Teddy Reed on Sisters, for which she received her first Emmy for Outstanding Lead Actress in a Drama Series in 1994. She portrayed Helen Kimble, the wife of Dr. Richard Kimble (Harrison Ford), in The Fugitive, one of the top films of 1993.

Ward won a CableACE Award for her portrayal of the late television journalist Jessica Savitch in the 1995 TV film Almost Golden: The Jessica Savitch Story. Almost Golden remains Lifetime's most watched TV film to date.

In 1995, Ward was passed over for a Bond girl role, learning that even though then-Bond Pierce Brosnan was 42, the casting director said "What we really want is Sela, but Sela ten years ago". In response, she developed and produced a documentary, The Changing Face of Beauty, about American obsession with youth and its effect on women. Later on, Ward would voice the part of former model turned villain Page Monroe in an episode ("Mean Seasons") of The New Batman/Superman Adventures, which focused primarily on the media's obsession with youth.

Ward succeeded Candice Bergen as commercial spokesperson for Sprint's long distance telephone service from 1999 until 2002. She also appeared on Frasier as supermodel/zoologist Kelly Easterbrook in the fifth season opener ("Frasier's Imaginary Friend"). When she read for the role of Lily Brooks Manning on the series Once and Again, its creators (Edward Zwick and Marshall Herskovitz of thirtysomething fame) initially deemed Ward "too beautiful" for the average single mother to identify with. Ward received her second lead actress Emmy and a Golden Globe Award.

In 2004, she played the role of a private investigator in the television film Suburban Madness. The same year, she also appeared in the film The Day After Tomorrow with Dennis Quaid and Jake Gyllenhaal. In 2005, she began a recurring role in the Fox dramatic series House as Stacy Warner, the hospital's attorney and formidable ex-partner of the protagonist Dr. Gregory House (played by Hugh Laurie). In 2006, Ward's character was written off the show. However, she made her last guest appearance in the series finale (which aired on May 21, 2012).

Ward was originally offered both the role of Megan Donner on CSI: Miami and Susan Mayer on Desperate Housewives, but turned both down. Ward was reluctant to commit to another lead role in an hour-long series because of the time away from her family it would require.

Although she was on a brief hiatus from television, she continued to appear in feature films. She starred opposite Kevin Costner in The Guardian in 2006 and starred in the thriller The Stepfather in 2009. In July 2010, Ward signed on to star in the police drama CSI: NY, at the seventh season's start. Ward remained on the show until the ninth and final season's end in February 2013.

Ward appeared as newswoman Sharon Schieber in Gone Girl (2014), and co-starred in Independence Day: Resurgence, released June 2016, in which she played the President of the United States, President Lanford. She also played the leading role alongside Nick Nolte in the political comedy series Graves. She was in a leading role alongside Missy Peregrym, Zeeko Zaki and Jeremy Sisto in the crime series FBI.

Personal life 
On May 23, 1992, Ward married entrepreneur Howard Elliott Sherman. They have two children: Austin and Anabella.

After meeting two foster children during a holiday trip home to Mississippi in 1997, Ward decided to meet a broader need for abused and neglected children by initiating and partially funding the creation of a permanent group home and emergency shelter, as well as transition houses. Hope Village for Children opened in Ward's hometown of Meridian in January 2002, housed on a  property once used as a Masonic-owned and operated orphanage, and is intended to serve as a pilot for a nationwide network of similar shelters. Hope Village currently has a capacity of 44 residents and serves an average of 300 children per year.

In 2002, Ward published her autobiography, Homesick: A Memoir, through HarperCollins' ReganBooks imprint. In 2014, Ward was a part of her first group art exhibition at KM Fine Arts.

Filmography

Film

Television

Legacy
A roughly  stretch of 22nd Avenue in Meridian (from 6th Street southeast to the Interstate 20 highway interchange) has been named the "Sela Ward Parkway" in her honor.

Awards and nominations

References

External links

 Hope Village for Children
 
 Sela Ward Interview on Sidewalks Entertainment

1956 births
Living people
People from Meridian, Mississippi
Actresses from Mississippi
American autobiographers
American film actresses
American television actresses
American voice actresses
Women autobiographers
American women non-fiction writers
University of Alabama alumni
20th-century American actresses
21st-century American actresses
Best Drama Actress Golden Globe (television) winners
Outstanding Performance by a Lead Actress in a Drama Series Primetime Emmy Award winners